Dokka Seethamma (or Sithamma; 1841–1909) was an Indian woman who gained recognition by spending much of her life serving food for poor people and travellers.

Seethamma was born in October 1841 in the village of Mandapeta, in Andhra Pradesh, and lost her mother during her childhood.

Dokka Joganna, a Vedic Scholar and  farmer, married her, and this allowed her to offer food to the poor, which she did for more than 40 years.

Always engaged in annadanam and rarely having a chance to step out of her home and village, she once wanted to visit Antarvedi for Lord Narasimha Swamy's darshan, but turned back and hastily to cook a meal after hearing a family of  pilgrims talking of being on their way to visit her home for food.

The British government recognized her charity, and King Edward VII invited her to the celebration of his anniversary along with other guests from India. He ordered the chief secretary of Madras to bring her to Delhi with honor, but Seethamma politely declined the invitation, saying that she was not providing her services for publicity. The Madras chief secretary instead gave King Edward a photograph of her, which he then enlarged to place on the chair where she was to sit during the celebration.

Seethamma was honored as a Hindu saint and called Apara Annapurna, a reincarnation of the goddess Annapurna. An aqueduct over the Vynateya river was named for her in 2000 and is marked with a bust depicting her.

References

1841 births
1909 deaths
Women educators from Andhra Pradesh
Educators from Andhra Pradesh
People from East Godavari district
19th-century Indian women
19th-century Indian people
Social workers from Andhra Pradesh
Social workers
Women from Andhra Pradesh
People from Andhra Pradesh